The following lists include extreme and significant points of the geography of Canada.


All Canada
Northernmost point — Cape Columbia, Ellesmere Island, Nunavut 
Southernmost point — South point of Middle Island, Ontario, in Lake Erie 
Easternmost point — Cape Spear, Newfoundland 
Westernmost point — Boundary Peak 187, Yukon

Non-insular (mainland) Canada
Northernmost point — Zenith Point, Nunavut 
Southernmost point —  Point Pelee, Ontario 
Easternmost point — Cape Saint Charles, Labrador 
Westernmost point — Boundary Peak 187, Yukon

Highest points
Mount Logan Yukon  — highest Canadian summit at 
Barbeau Peak, Ellesmere Island, Nunavut  — highest Canadian island summit and highest summit of the Canadian Arctic at

Lowest points
Coastline — lowest Canadian surface point at sea level
Great Slave Lake bottom, Northwest Territories  — lowest fresh water point of North America at

Islands
Baffin Island, Nunavut  — most extensive Canadian island at 
Ellesmere Island, Nunavut  — tallest Canadian island at 
Island of Newfoundland, Newfoundland and Labrador  — most extensive Canadian Atlantic island at 
Vancouver Island, British Columbia  — most extensive Canadian Pacific island at 
Manitoulin Island in Lake Huron, Ontario  — most extensive lake island on Earth at

Lakes
Lake Superior, Ontario  — most voluminous lake of Western Hemisphere at 
Great Slave Lake, Northwest Territories  — deepest lake of Western Hemisphere at 
Lake Michigan–Huron, Ontario  — by some considerations the most extensive lake of Western Hemisphere and the most extensive freshwater lake on Earth at 
Nettilling Lake on Baffin Island, Nunavut  — most extensive lake on an island on Earth at 
Lake Manitou on Manitoulin Island in Lake Huron, Ontario  — most extensive lake on an island in a lake on Earth at 
Upper Dumbell Lake on Ellesmere Island Nunavut  — most northern lake, there are more northern lakes but they are all unnamed and are only shown on detailed maps.

Rivers
Yukon River, British Columbia, Yukon, and Alaska  — longest Bering Sea main stem river at 
Nelson River, Manitoba  — longest Hudson Bay main stem river at 
Columbia River, British Columbia  — longest Canadian Pacific Ocean main stem river at 
Mackenzie River, Northwest Territories  — longest Canadian Arctic Ocean main stem river at 
Saint Lawrence River, Ontario and Quebec  — longest Canadian Atlantic Ocean main stem river at

See also

Geography of Canada
Extreme points of North America
Extreme points of Canadian provinces
Extreme communities of Canada
Nordicity
Remote and isolated community

Notes

References

External links

Lists of landforms of Canada
Canada